Our Lady of Apostles Girls Senior High School is an all female second cycle institution in Ho in the Volta Region of Ghana.

History
OLA Senior High School was established on 1 February 1954 by Bishop Anthony Konings in Keta with 35 students. The school started from the borrowed premises of the convent boarding school for girls and the nearby middle school building which was converted into classrooms, dining hall and a dormitory block.

Programs offered 

 General Science 
 Home Economics
 General Arts
 Business 
Visual Arts

Vision 
Providing quality and holistic education for academic and moral excellence in a disciplined school environment through technology.

Headmistresses 
 Sr. Theodorus Fahy (1954–1976)
 Sr. Marie O’Driscoll (1976–1982)
 Sr. Mary Connaughton (1982–1983)
 Loretta MacCarthy (1983–1985)
 Sr. Regina Kampo, the first Ghanaian OLA Sister to head the school (1985–1997)
 Sr. Bernadette Kofitse (1997–1999)
 Mrs. Philomena Afeti (1999 – June 2010)
 Mrs. Benedicta A. Afesi (August 2010 – present)

Notable alumni
 Bernice Adiku-Heloo, MP Hohoe North and Deputy Minister Environment Science, Technology and Innovations
 Sefadzi Abena Amesu (popularly known as S3fa), Afrobeats / afro pop musician
 Felicia Edem Attipoe, aircraft marshaller
 Juliana Azumah-Mensah, MP and former Minister of State
 Kafui Danku, actress, movie producer and writer
 Agnes Dordzie, Justice of the Supreme Court of Ghana (2018–2022)
 Peace Adzo Medie, writer
 Harriet Sena Siaw-Boateng, Ghana's Permanent Representative to The European Union (2019–)

References

External links

High schools in Ghana
Education in Volta Region
Girls' schools in Ghana
Educational institutions established in 1954
Boarding schools in Ghana
1954 establishments in Gold Coast (British colony)